Sione Sonasi "Bo" Po'uha (born February 3, 1979) is a former American football coach and former defensive tackle. On December 20 2022, Sione accepted the position to be the defensive tackles coach at Brigham Young University football. He previously served as the defensive line coach at the University of Utah, for whom he played college football. He announced his retirement from coaching on January 11, 2022. He is an active member of the Church of Jesus Christ of Latter-day Saints.

Early life
Pouha began playing football at the young age of nine. Pouha attended East High School in Salt Lake City, Utah, where he was a two-year first-team all-region player and captained East High's state championship team in 1996. He earned USA Today honorable mention All-American honors as senior in 1996 and was a Deseret News and Salt Lake Tribune first-team all-state selection. Pouha signed a letter of intent with Utah in 1997, then left on a Mormon mission to Pittsburgh.

College career
In his senior season at Utah, Pouha earned All-Mountain West Conference first-team honors and was named USA Today All-America honorable mention after starting ten games, recording 36 tackles, four passes defended and one interception, and helped lead Urban Meyer's Utes to the 2005 Fiesta Bowl. Pouha had never considered playing beyond the college level; however, during his senior season he changed his mind after receiving a phone call from an agent.

Career

New York Jets

2005
Pouha, who was considered a "project" player, was drafted by the New York Jets in the third round of the 2005 NFL Draft. Pouha appeared in fourteen games as a rookie, recording ten tackles and one pass defended.

2006
Following his rookie season, Pouha suffered a torn ACL on the fourth day of training camp and was subsequently knocked out for the entire 2006 football year.

2007
Motivated following his ACL injury which eliminated him for all of 2006, Pouha played in all sixteen games during the season, starting one game. Pouha recorded 39 tackles and had one pass defended.

2008
Pouha once again appeared in all of the team's sixteen matchups, recording 23 tackles, and recorded his first half-sack of his career against New England Patriots quarterback Matt Cassel.

2009

Pouha went into the 2009 season as the back-up defensive tackle. Six games into the season, the Jets lost Pro Bowl starter Kris Jenkins who suffered a torn ACL. The injury would thrust Pouha into the spotlight as he became the team's starting nose tackle, starting the team's next thirteen games. Pouha achieved multiple career highs, starting a career-high fourteen games and making a career 61 tackles, 34 of which were solo. Pouha and teammate Mike DeVito helped improve the rushing defense from twenty-first to fourth overall in the NFL. Pouha and the team entered the postseason until falling against the Indianapolis Colts in the AFC Championship.

2010
Pouha started the first game of the 2010 season alongside a returning Kris Jenkins. Six plays into the team's Monday night home opener against the Baltimore Ravens, Jenkins once again suffered a season-ending torn ACL. Pouha, again, assumed Jenkins' role as nose tackle alongside teammates Mike DeVito and Howard Green. Pouha was considered to be an excellent run-stopper and, as the season progressed, the team liked to see Pouha more involved in pass-rushing and getting to the quarterback. Pouha and the Jets made the postseason for the second straight year but lost to the Pittsburgh Steelers in the AFC Championship.

2011
In Week 14 of the 2011 NFL season, Pouha tackled running back Jackie Battle in the end zone for a safety vs the Kansas City Chiefs. The Jets finished 8-8 that year.

2012
Po'uha was diagnosed with a back strain during the 2012 season and missed some games because of it. The Jets finished with a 6-10 record that season. Po'uha was released by the Jets on March 12, 2013.

Coaching career
Po'uha began his coaching career at the University of Utah as a student-assistant coach in 2015 and 2016, followed by being the director of football player development in 2017. In 2018, he became the defensive tackles coach at the United States Naval Academy.

After one season at Navy, he returned to Utah as the defensive line coach for 2019. In early 2022 following the 2022 Rose Bowl Po'uha announced on he would be retiring from coaching. For the 2023 season Po'uha chose to return to coaching after being hired at Brigham Young University (BYU).

Personal
Pouha was born to Sonasi and Susana Pouha. He married his college sweetheart, Keiti Kaufusi Pouha, while he was still attending the University of Utah. The couple have four children, two sons, Viliami and Sonasi; and two daughters, Leilani and Kesaia. Pouha's parents were immigrants from Tonga.

Pouha majored in behavior science and health.

Pouha created a beverage business named Bula. Pouha has described the beverage as a "relaxation drink" that is a combination of kava and valerian root. The drink is currently sold online and in stores in northern California. For a time Po'uha served as bishop of the Bountiful 6th Ward, a Tongan-language ward in Utah. He has also served as a seminary and institute teacher in the LDS Church.

References

External links
New York Jets bio
Utah Utes bio
Twitter
https://kslsports.com/476743/utah-dt-coach-sione-pouha-announces-retirement-from-coaching/

1979 births
American people of Tongan descent
American football defensive tackles
Living people
New York Jets players
Utah Utes football players
Latter Day Saints from Utah
Players of American football from Utah
American Mormon missionaries in the United States
Navy Midshipmen football coaches
BYU Cougars football coaches